Sir John Montague Stow  (3 October 1911 – 16 March 1997) was a British colonial official who served in various roles. 

The son of Indian civilian Sir Alexander Montague Stow, John Stow was born in Simla, India, and was educated at Harrow and Pembroke College, Cambridge. He joined the Colonial Administrative Service in 1934 and was posted as a cadet to Nigeria. In 1938 he was appointed administrative officer in Kenya, and was seconded to The Gambia later that year as assistant district officer.

From 1947 until 1953 he served as the British government's Commissioner of Saint Lucia.  In a later role, he was the last governor of the former colony of Barbados, serving from 8 October 1959 until 29 November 1966, and following Barbados obtaining independence from the United Kingdom on 30 November 1966, Stow was appointed as the first governor-general of Barbados, a position he served until 18 May 1967. He died on 16 March 1997, aged 85.

See also
 List of Governors of Barbados
 Governor-General of Barbados

References

External links
 
 Barbados, Worldstatesmen
 Photo, Barbados Ministry of Education, Science, Technology and Innovation

 

1911 births
1997 deaths
People educated at Harrow School
Alumni of Pembroke College, Cambridge
Colonial Administrative Service officers
Governors-General of Barbados
Knights Grand Cross of the Order of St Michael and St George
Knights Commander of the Royal Victorian Order
Governors of British Saint Lucia
Governors of Barbados